Ammanford Urban District Council was a former local authority in Carmarthenshire. It was established under the provisions of the Local Government Act 1894 in 1903 and comprised parts of the parishes of Llandybie and Betws. It was created specifically as a result of the rapid population growth in the town as a result of the expansion of the Welsh anthracite coalfield.

Ammanford Urban District Council comprised fifteen councillors including a chairman and, following the initial election of fifteen members a third of the council stood down annually.  The council, like other urban districts, was responsible for sanitation, sewerage,  housing, streets, cemeteries, libraries, parks, and the licensing of public entertainments. The council was administered by a number of committees and by officers including a Clerk and Medical Officer of Health.

The council was abolished in 1974 and Ammanford became part of Dinefwr Borough Council

Election Results

1903 Election
In the first election, eight of the fifteen seats were won by labour candidates.

Elected: D J Jones, ironmonger (I); 374 E Hewlett, colliery manager (I); 3G; W N Jones, auctioneer (I); 352 J Morgans, haulier (Lab), 345; John Davies shearer (Lab); 327 Lieut-Col D Morris (Ind), 315; E. Evans, checkweigher (Lab); 311 Henry Davies, carpenter (Lab); 302 S Callard. Chemical Works (I); 300 Wm Jones, draper (I); 285 D George, collier, (Lab), 270; W Rees, annealer (Lab), 263 T Fletcher, rollerman (Lab), 256 J E Jones, collier (Lab), 246; E Jones, shearer (Lab), 241.

Non-elected J Cooper Davies, engineer (Lab), 223 T L Davies, baker (I), 201 D Thomas, builder (I), 200; E Evans, chemist (I), 199; H Lewis, hotel keeper (I), 136; B R Evans, draper (I), 124; John Harries, inn keeper (I), 123 ; H. Davies, weaver (I), 43.

1904 Election 
Following the inaugural elections five labour candidates retired. two of them did not seek re-election and three of the five seats were won by Independent candidates.

1905 Election 
Four of the five retiring members were re-elected.

1906 Election 
D.J. Jones, who headed the poll at the first election in 1903 lost his seat.

1907 Election 
Labour candidates fared badly in this election.

1908 Election 
Due to a vacancy, six candidates were returned at this election.

1910 Election 
A closely fought election saw one of the leading members of the authority defeated.

1911 Election 
W.N. Jones regained his seat following a surprise defeat the previous year.

1912 Election 
Four of the five retiring members were returned.

1913 Election 
In a somewhat heated campaign three of the five sitting members were defeated.

1914 Election
Although fourteen candidates sought election for the five seats, the election was described as a quiet affair with no public meetings.

1919 Election
Elections were postponed during the war and the first post-war election was fiercely contested between Labour and non-Labour candidates. The latter won all the seats.

References

Politics of Carmarthenshire
Urban district councils of Wales
Ammanford